Léopold "Pol" Anoul (19 August 1922 – 11 February 1990) was a Belgian footballer.

During his club career he played for Royal FC Liégeois (1942–1957) and Standard Liège (1957–1960). From 1947 to 1954, he earned 48 caps and scored 20 goals for the Belgium national football team, including 3 goals in the 1954 FIFA World Cup.

His nickname was "l'homme de Colombes" (the man from Colombes) after a wonderful goal he scored for Belgium against France in the stadium of Colombes near Paris.

References

1922 births
1990 deaths
Walloon sportspeople
Belgian footballers
Belgium international footballers
1954 FIFA World Cup players
RFC Liège players
Standard Liège players
Belgian Pro League players
Footballers from Liège
Belgian football managers
R. Charleroi S.C. managers

Association football forwards